Rosemarie Joy Garcia-Smith (born April 15, 1985), better known by her stage name Diana Zubiri, is a Filipino actress.  She was discovered by Seiko Films when she was 15, years after applying for work in Japan. She then had sexy roles in various films by Seiko.  In October 2002, Zubiri became widely known in the Philippines after posing on the top of the EDSA–Shaw flyover in Mandaluyong, wearing only a two-piece bikini. That photo shoot for FHM Philippines sparked controversy and prompted the then Mayor of Mandaluyong, Benhur Abalos, to file charges against Zubiri and FHM but it was later withdrawn after an apology.

In 2005, Zubiri slowly departed from sexy films and proceeded to become a TV actress in GMA Network.  One of her notable roles was portraying Divina in the drama series Linlang and Danaya in the Encantadia fantasy series. She was also a regular cast member in the sketch-comedy program, Bubble Gang and starred in drama series including Babangon Ako't Dudurugin Kita, Danny Zialcita's Gaano Kadalas Ang Minsan? and Nita Negrita.

In 2012, after nine years of staying at the GMA Network, she transferred to its rival network ABS-CBN and signed a 3-year exclusive contract. During her younger years, Zubiri applied multiple times at ABS-CBN's Talent Center before applying for Japan but she was rejected. In 2015, she returned to her home network, GMA Network.

Biography

Personal life
When Zubiri was eight years old, her father left her and her elder sister.  Her mother at Olongapo, who maintained a sari-sari store, took care of them. The family later transferred to Fairview, Quezon City and rented a house, where Zubiri stayed during her younger years.  Her mother remarried and bore a child that became Zubiri's halfsister.

Zubiri was a member of the Iglesia ni Cristo but later converted to Roman Catholicism during her early part of her show business career. In 2012, it was reported that she studied theatre arts at Miriam College. On May 10, 2015, Zubiri married her longtime boyfriend Andy Smith in New Manila, Quezon City. They have a daughter named Aliyah Rose born on August 14, 2016.

Later career

After a few sexy flicks, Zubiri became a GMA Network artist, appearing as a regular cast in Bubble Gang, a sketch comedy television program.  She also appeared in Encantadia as Danaya, the diwata that holds the Jewel of the Earth. She later reprised that role in Etheria and Encantadia: Pag-ibig Hanggang Wakas.

Zubiri co-starred as "Ingrid" on Asian Treasures alongside Angel Locsin, Robin Padilla, and Marvin Agustin. She was also a cast member on GMA Network's Bubble Gang, and previously dated Bubble Gang co-star Wendell Ramos. From that point, Zubiri was considered a full-fledged TV-movie celebrity and no longer considered a sexy star.

When Seiko Films, her home studio, closed down in late 2007, she became a freelancer and appeared in her first Regal Films movie, Shake, Rattle & Roll X, a 34th MMFF (Metro Manila Film Festival) entry which also included her film One Night Only under OctoArts Films.

Comeback
After two years of not being in films and on television, Diana went back on TV via Jillian for GMA Network and starred alongside drama queen Claudine Barretto. In December 2010, Diana has been cast to GMA Network mid-season television pilot Neta Negrita as part of the regular cast member. In March 2012, Zubiri won the Best Performer Award from the Young Critics Circle for her performance in the film Bahay Bata where she played a nurse. The film itself would go on to win the Jury Prize at the Deauville Asian Film Festival in France, held on March 7–11, 2012. It was confirmed that Zubiri signed a contract with ABS-CBN and would have a teleserye with Gerald Anderson and Cristine Reyes. After the expiration of her contract with ABS-CBN, she starred in a number of episodes of Karelasyon that were aired in GMA Network.

In 2016 after Zubiri's showbiz hiatus she returned to GMA Network via the remake of Encantadia as LilaSari, one of the major antagonists and got a supporting role as Isabel in D' Originals.

Filmography

Television

Film

Awards and recognition

FHM ranking
From her first appearance in the magazine in June 2002 as Girls of FHM, six months later she became a cover girl of FHM, when she posed on the EDSA-Shaw Boulevard flyover, she has consistently ranked at FHM Philippines' annual survey (FHM 100 Sexiest Women in the World). She has appeared in an FHM Calendar with Maui Taylor of Viva Films and Aubrey Miles of Regal Films. Until 2011, Diana has constantly remained at the top ten of the list. She also appeared in the FHM editions of Thailand, Singapore and Indonesia. In September 2014 she return to cover FHM for the fourth time, as part of first of four part FHM special, along with Rachel Anne Daquis, Myrtle Sarrosa and Andrea Torres. For 13 years, Zubiri still included in the list grabbing Rank No. 19, however she not participate at the FHM BroCon event at the SMX Convention Center.

Other awards
On June 27, 2012, Zubiri accepted her Young Critics Circle award for Best Performance at the ceremonies held at the University of the Philippines.   After receiving the award, she jokingly said that it is the only award she ever got after her sexy pictorial in FHM since 2002.

References

External links
 

1985 births
Living people
Converts to Roman Catholicism from Unitarianism
Filipino film actresses
Filipino Roman Catholics
Filipino television actresses
Former members of Iglesia ni Cristo
Actresses from Bulacan
ABS-CBN personalities
Star Magic
GMA Network personalities
TV5 (Philippine TV network) personalities
Filipino female models
Filipina gravure idols
Miriam College alumni